Stuart's Advertising Agency was, during the 1920s and 1930s, one of the leading London advertising agencies. Located at Kingsway House, Kingsway, the firm was founded in 1922 by H. Stuart Menzies. It had accounts with Elizabeth Arden, Keiller's marmalade, Shell-Mex & BP, Speedwriting, Crosse & Blackwell, Harper's Bazaar, Imperial Airways, Indian Trans-Continental Airways, Lewis Berger Paints, Toblerone and Qantas. Menzies retired in 1938-39 and moved first to Tahiti and later to Canada with his wife Elizabeth.

Employees
Marcus Brumwell joined the firm in the early 1920s and became Managing Director when Menzies retired. Two other influential figures in the organisation in the late 1930s were D Lewis and the typographer/copywriter Robert Harling. While Menzies was an exceptional copywriter, Brumwell played a key role in liaising with leading contemporary artists of the time: Edward Bawden, Ben Nicholson, Edward McKnight Kauffer and Barbara Hepworth.

Recognition
Stuart Advertising Agency is featured in the book Bright Ties Bold Ideas - Marcus Brumwell, Pioneer of C20 Advertising, Champion of the Artists by Joe Brumwell published in 2010 and entertaining a la carte by Mainstone Press, 2007.

References

Advertising agencies of the United Kingdom